Lukáš Finsterle (born March 9, 1990) is a Czech professional ice hockey player for HC Bobři Valašské Meziříčí of the 2nd Czech Republic Hockey League.

Finsterle played 48 games with HC Zlín in the Czech Extraliga from 2009 to 2012. He also played in the Erste Bank Eishockey Liga for Orli Znojmo and the Tipsport Liga.

References

External links

1990 births
Living people
Czech ice hockey forwards
EC Kapfenberg players
SHK Hodonín players
Hokej Šumperk 2003 players
MHC Martin players
Orli Znojmo players
HC RT Torax Poruba players
HC ZUBR Přerov players
SK Horácká Slavia Třebíč players
Stadion Hradec Králové players
VHK Vsetín players
PSG Berani Zlín players
Sportspeople from Zlín
Czech expatriate ice hockey players in Germany
Czech expatriate ice hockey players in Slovakia
Czech expatriate sportspeople in Austria
Expatriate ice hockey players in Austria